The Pride of the Fancy is a British silent motion picture of 1920 directed by Richard Garrick and Albert Ward, produced by G. B. Samuelson, and starring Rex Davis, Daisy Burrell and Tom Reynolds. A drama, it was based on a novel by George Edgar.

Plot
After being demobbed from the army, Phil Moran is out of work and joins a troupe of athletes managed by Professor Bonkish. When Kitty, his employer's daughter, is pursued by an unwelcome rich admirer, Moran protects her, but is beaten up. Meanwhile, the unscrupulous Ireton has designs on Sir Rufus Douglas's daughter Hilda, but she loves Oswald Gordon. Moran goes on to become a boxing champion and to win the hand of Kitty.

Cast
 Rex Davis – Phil Moran 
 Daisy Burrell – Kitty Ruston
 Tom Reynolds – Professor Ruston
 Fred Morgan – Ireton 
 Dorothy Fane – Hilda Douglas 
 Wyndham Guise – Sir Rufus Douglas 
 F. Pope-Stamper –  Oswald Gordon
 Kid Gordon – James Croon

Reviews
Variety commented that "Daisy Burrell is a charming Kitty, although she is rather inclined to overact. Rex Davis does most of the work as Moran, taking and receiving many a hard blow, but whether fighting or making love, he is an exceptionally manly and convincing hero. Tom Reynolds presents a delightful character study of the old showman. Fred Morgan adds another picture of villainy to his already crowded gallery. Pope Stamper does what is required of him as Gordon quite well, and Dorothy Fane proves herself capable of good work by a sympathetic study of the persecuted Hilda."

Kinematograph Monthly was less kind, commenting "a melodramatic sporting picture with not much detail" and "suitable for uncritical audiences".

References

External links

1920 films
1920s English-language films
Films directed by Richard Garrick
Films set in England
British drama films
1920 drama films
British silent feature films
Films directed by Albert Ward
British black-and-white films
Silent drama films
1920s British films